Sistema de Inteligencia Nacional (National Intelligence System, SIN) is the official denomination of the Argentine national intelligence community.

The National Intelligence System consists of the following agencies and its dependencies: 
Secretaría de Inteligencia (Secretariat of Intelligence, S.I)
Escuela Nacional de Inteligencia (National Intelligence School, ENI)
Dirección de Observaciones Judiciales (Directorate of Judicial Surveillance, DOJ)
Dirección Nacional de Inteligencia Criminal (National Directorate of Criminal Intelligence, DNIC)
Dirección Nacional de Inteligencia Estratégica Militar (National Directorate of Strategic Military Intelligence, DNIEM)

The National Intelligence System came online with the 2001 Intelligence Reform Law 25.520.

See also
List of Secretaries of Intelligence
Argentine intelligence agencies
Secretariat of Intelligence
National Intelligence School
Directorate of Judicial Surveillance
National Directorate of Criminal Intelligence
National Directorate of Strategic Military Intelligence

External links
 Intelligence Reform Law 25.520
 Interior Security Law 24.059

 
Law enforcement in Argentina
Argentina